The 5th Administrative Council of North Korea was elected by the 1st Session of the 5th Supreme People's Assembly on 26 December 1972. It was replaced on 16 December 1977 by the 6th Administrative Council.

Members

References

Citations

Bibliography
Books:
 

5th Supreme People's Assembly
Cabinet of North Korea
1972 establishments in North Korea
1977 disestablishments in North Korea